The Unified Team was the name used for the sports team of the former Soviet Union 
(except the Baltic states) at the 1992 Winter Olympics in Albertville and the 1992 Summer Olympics in Barcelona. The IOC country code was EUN, after the French name, Équipe unifiée.  The Unified Team was sometimes informally called the CIS Team (Commonwealth of Independent States, as a counterpart of CIS national football team taking part in Euro 1992 of the same year), although Georgia did not join the CIS until 1993.

The team finished second in the medal table at the 1992 Winter Games, and first at the 1992 Summer Games, edging its old rival the US in the latter.

Ceremony procedures
At the 1992 Winter Olympics, the National Olympic Committees (NOCs) of the constituent countries had not yet been affiliated to the IOC due to the dissolution of the Soviet Union having only taken place little more than two months prior. During the opening ceremony, the team's placard displayed Équipe unifiée in large print, with the names of the five participating countries displayed in smaller print below, and both the French and English announcers announced only the names of the participating countries without announcing the name "Unified Team". Russian flagbearer Valeriy Medvedtsev followed, carrying the Olympic Flag, followed by the team's athletes in no particular order, each carrying a small flag representing their individual country. At medals ceremonies, the Olympic Flag was used and the Olympic Hymn was played for gold medalists.

By the time of the Summer Olympics, the NOCs had affiliated separately, though they fielded a joint team with a standard uniform as Olympic qualifying rounds had been completed before the final demise of the Soviet Union. During the opening ceremony, the team's four-sided placard displayed "Unified Team" in the four official languages (French, English, Spanish, and Catalan), followed by Russian flagbearer Aleksandr Karelin carrying the Olympic Flag, followed by three more four-sided placards displaying the 12 constituent countries in English, followed by 12 flagbearers carrying the national flags of the 12 countries, followed by the athletes in no particular order. The announcers announced the name "Unified Team" in multiple languages, followed by the Spanish announcer announcing all 12 countries. During medals ceremonies, where an EUN individual won a medal, the national flag of the medalist's nation was raised rather than the Olympic flag, and a gold medalist's national anthem was played rather than the Olympic Hymn.  In team events, the EUN team continued to use the Olympic flag and the Olympic Hymn, as team members represented different nations.

Participating countries 
While only five of the EUN countries took part in the 1992 Winter Olympics, all twelve participated in the 1992 Summer Olympics. At the 1994 Winter Olympics and the 1996 Summer Olympics, the nations that were part of the Unified Team started to make their Olympic debuts as independent countries.

* Unified Team participant in the Winter Olympic Games.

Timeline of participation

Medal tables

Medals by Summer Games

Medals by Winter Games

Medals by summer sport

Medals by winter sport

Flag bearers 

  1992 Albertville Winter Olympics - Valeriy Medvedtsev (Biathlon)
  1992 Barcelona Summer Olympics - Aleksandr Karelin (Wrestling)

See also
Unified Team at the Paralympics
Unified Team of Germany
Independent Olympic Participants at the 1992 Summer Olympics
CIS national football team
Olympic Athletes from Russia

References

External links
 
 
 

 
Unified Team at multi-sport events
Sport in the Commonwealth of Independent States